St. Bede's is a school in Chennai (Madras), Tamil Nadu, India.  The school was started in 1907 to provide Catholic education for children of European and Anglo-Indian descent.

History

The first 25 years

St. Bede's School was born in 1907. When Lord Curzon announced the scheme of European education for the whole of India, His Lordship the Bishop of Mylapore, Dom Theotonius Emmanuel Rebeiro Vieire de Castro, decided to start a school separate from the San Thome High School for the benefit of the Anglo-Indian children. The "Leland's Garden", a building on the Santhome High Road which now forms part of the C.S.I. School for Deaf & Dumb, was rented to house the new school. These premises were taken over later for housing the present school for deaf and dumb.

On 18 January 1907, St Bede's (then known as St. Bede's European High School) was formally blessed and declared open by its reverend founder – His Lordship the Bishop of Mylapore - Dom Theotonius Emmanuel Rebeiro Vieira de Castro.

The school began in 1907 with six classes: Standard II to Standard VII, and with Rev. Fr. M.I. Anacleto as its first Headmaster. Seventeen inmates of the San Thome Orphanage who were studying in the San Thome High School were brought on to the rolls of the new School. A new boarding (The St. Bede's Boarding) was started with just three students. These, with the 35-day scholars, brought the strength of the school to 55 in the first year. The San Thome Orphanage (also started by the founder of St. Bede's) and the St. Bede's Boarding were always considered part of St. Bede's School, as their inmates were pupils of the School. Rev. Fr. M.J. Salgado was the Director of the Boarding House and Rev. Fr. D’Costa was in charge of the Orphanage.

In 1908, when Fr Anacleto went on leave, Fr. Salgado took over as headmaster. The first high school class was begun in 1909 and science was introduced.

In 1909 the Bishop of Mylapore invited the Selesian Fathers to take over the San Thome Orphanage, which had been under the direct management of the mission of Mylapore. Rev. Fr. George Tomatis, S.D.B., who was then working in Tanjore, was called upon to shoulder the new responsibility as the Director. An exceptionally gifted man, Fr. Tomatis was a multi-linguist. As a boy, he had been in personal contact with Don Bosco and he had served the Saint's mass for three years.

The first batch of High School candidates from St. Bede's appeared for the European High School Examination in December 1909. Joseph Sears secured the first rank in the Madras Presidency. He was later killed on the battlefield in France during the First World War.

In 1913, work started on a new building (the one on the northern end of the San Thome Orphanage compound). Rev. Fr. J.J. Lopez became the School's First Correspondent. Among the newcomers on the staff that year was Rev. Fr. Francis A Carvalho, who later became the auxiliary Bishop of Madras and Mylapore. The same year, Joseph B. Figredo (later Rev. Fr. J B Freeman, and Principal of St. Bede's from 1944) secured the first rank in the Presidency. He was the only candidate to get a First Class in Madras.

In 1914, Fr. Villa Verde took charge as Principal and saw the school through the First World War. He proved to be one of the most outstanding Principals of St. Bede's. On 29 April 1914, the new building was blessed by Bishop of Mylapore and inaugurated by the Hon. Justice Sir John Wallis, Kt. The boarding is housed in "Bethany House" and the Orphanage in the Old Parish Hall (now the Community Hall which is opposite Santhome Basilica).

While the school moved into the new building, the boarders were moved into a separate building, the present "Church View" on Rosary Church Road. In the war years some of the older pupils were mobilized into the Volunteer Corps.

In 1920, Fr. Lopez Pires was appointed Principal and Correspondent. In 1921, Fr. Villa Verde returned from Europe  and took charge as Principal and Correspondent. In 1922, Mr. G.C. D’Cruz was appointed as Headmaster – the first layman to hold the post.

About this time there was great enthusiasm for the Scout movement and 24 of the school youngsters who had passed the Tenderfoot examination were formed into the first school Scout troop. The school won the European Schools Athletic Association Championship for four years in succession.

On 25 November 1925, St. Bede's and its affiliates received the news of the passing away of Rev. Fr. George Tomatis at St. Martha's Hospital in Bangalore. Fr. Thomatis was the leader of the first pioneering group of Salesians who came to India from Europe in 1906, he directed the San Thome Orphanage from 1901 till his death in 1925 at the age of sixty. Fr. Hanker, S.D.B. takes charge of the Orphanage.

The steady increase in the requests for seats in the Boarding House necessitated moving out a third time in 1926. The unit now shifted to ‘Bainten’, a vacant house on the San Thome High Road.

The Orphanage too had grown – from 35 boys in 1909 to 280 boys in 1928, when the Salesians handed the institution back to the Mylapore Mission. This change was necessary because the Salesians were needed at the Archdiocese of Madras, which had been given to their charge. The Rev. Fr. A. Neves of the diocese of Mylapore took over the Orphanage from the Salesians.

On 5 March 1930, Lt. Col. The Hon’ble Sir George Stanley, in the presence of Lady Stanley, laid the foundation stone of the New Building and Boarding House building, which now forms part of the present Eastern Wing of our School building. In September 1930, St. Bede's got a Bus – "The Old Grunter".

The new Bishop of Mylapore, Dom Antonio Maria Texeira, began making plans for expansion. One half of the structure planned was ready in about two years time and the school and the boarding house moved into it. In July 1931, Mr. R.E. Davey joined the staff. The following year, in April 1932, the Founder Dom Theotonius de Castro, who had by then been made Patriarch of the East Indies, visited the School and blessed the new building. The ground floor was utilized for classrooms, the upper floor being used as residential quarters. St. Bede's School and the Boarding thus found a permanent home in 1932, its Silver Jubilee year which was celebrated in September with the formal inauguration of the new building by Hon. Chief Justice Sir Owen Beasley.

26th year - 50th year

On 15 March 1933, the Bishop Texeira died suddenly of a heart attack. In January 1935, Rev. Fr. B.A. Figredo joined the staff. In March that year, Fr. Ville Verde retired after twenty-one years of service as Principal and left for Europe. Rev. Fr. Lopez took over from him as Principal. In 1937, the School received recognition for Senior Cambridge. In 1937, Fr. Figredo acted for Fr. Lopez, who went to Portugal. Fr. Lawrence Pereira was appointed as Procurator. In 1938, Fr. Lopez returned and was appointed as Boarding Master.

The Second World War upset the smooth working of the School. On 12 March 1942, St Bede's was ordered to evacuate to Coimbatore and share a building with St. Patrick's of Adyar. As the accommodation was inadequate, St. Bede's decided to move to Tanjore. Mr. G.C. D’Cruz resigned that year. A Catholic gentleman, Mr. Arulanandaswamy Nadar, placed a spacious ground at the disposal of the School. The Rev. Fr. B.A. Figredo, Headmaster of St. Anthony's Tanjore, permitted St. Bede's to use his classrooms.

In August 1943, the Orphanage and Chapel was gutted by fire and the school at Madras was occupied by the military authorities. In 1944, Fr. Fr Lopez retired and Fr. J.B. Freeman, M.A., L.T., Ph.D., became the Principal. In January 1945 Fr. B.A. Figredo is made the Principal and it was in Tanjore that Mr. G.V. D’Netto joined the School.

After the war the military vacated the school and St. Bede's returned to Madras on 8 July 1946. Classes started again on 10 July 1946. The buildings used by the military were left in a very shabby condition. Fr. Figredo and his team had a Herculean task putting the building back into working order.

In 1952, the two Dioceses of Madras and Mylapore were reorganized. Some portions of the old Mylapore Diocese were joined and the old Archdiocese of Madras forming the new Archdiocese of Madras and Mylapore, with The Most Rev. Dr. Louis Mathias as its first Archbishop. Thus St. Bede's, which had so far been under the diocese of Mylapore, now came under the new Archdiocese of Madras and Mylapore. In 1953, Fr. G. Lawson was appointed General Prefect and Assistant Headmaster.

Archbishop Dr. Louis Mathias soon moved his headquarters to San Thome and set about his task. In 1954, he gave orders to demolish the military sheds that were being used as classrooms and to complete the construction of the main block, one half of which had been completed in 1932 by Bishop Texeira. Along the eastern end of the campus he put up the building, which now serves as the kitchen, dining hall and infirmary. The Archbishop then handed over the Old Parish Hall to the school to be used as a chapel. The New Block (Western Wing) was completed and housed Std VI and Std VII with the chapel upstairs. When all the buildings were ready, he moved the orphanage also in, thus forming one unit with the boarding. In 1955, Mr. F.M. Theobald retired after 35 years of service.

In 1956, the Archbishop invited the Salesians to take over the institution. A Group of Salesians, with Rev. Fr. Tuena as its First Rector and Correspondent, and Rev. Fr. J.P. Mallon as its First Salesian Principal, took over in January 1956. Thus, St. Bede's was passed on to the care of the Salesians of Don Bosco. The year of transition passed quietly, ringing in the Golden Jubilee Year, 1957. When Rev. Fr. Mallon went on leave in January, Rev. Fr. Ittyachen, S.D.B. B.Sc., B.T. took over as its first Indian Principal until June and then Mr. R.E. Davey is appointed as its acting Headmaster.

The Golden Jubilee year of 1957 saw the starting of the feeder school, Dominic Savio Preparatory School. The Jubilee celebrations from 31 August to 1 September, were attended by a large gathering of distinguished guests, including several church and state dignitaries.

51st year - 75th year

In March 1958, Fr. Mallon returned from Europe and took over as Principal and from 15 June 1958, Rev Fr. Joseph Menezes took over from him as Principal.

Rev. Fr. Di Fiore was transferred to Bombay in 1964 and Rev. Fr. Joseph Murphy came to St. Bede's with wide experience in the field of education, having been the Principal of Sacred Heart College, Tirupattur for nearly a decade.

In August 1965, Archbishop Dr. Louis Mathias died. In May 1966, Rev. Fr. H. Tuena died; he had been its first Salesian rector. Fr. Murphy was transferred to Tirupattur to take Fr. Tuena's place and Fr. C. Restelli was appointed Rector and Principal of St. Bede's.

In 1969 Rev. Fr. Stephen Bernard took over from Fr. Restelli as rector and Principal. Mr. R.E. Davey retired as Headmaster and Mr. G. D’Netto took over from him as the new headmaster. On Old Bedean, Mr. Davey served the school for 33 years, including eight years as Headmaster. On the eve of his retirement, he was fittingly honoured by Pope John Paul II with the award of "Pro Ecclesia et Pontifice".

In 1970, Rev. Fr. Otto Harris took over from Fr. Stephen Bernard, as Rector and Correspondent. That year, on 14 November, school received the news of the sudden death of Rev. Fr. Murphy, who had been its Rector four years earlier. He died of a heart attack, in Tirupattur while playing cricket. 1972 marked the 19th centenary of the death of St. Thomas, Apostle of Christ, who came to India in 52 A.D. The tomb of St. Thomas is located inside the ancient basilica, which is next door to the school. St. Bede's played an active role in the week-long celebrations.

Rev. Fr. Joy Panackel took over as Rector in July 1973 from Fr. O. Harris. Mr. G. D’Netto retired in September and Rev. Fr. P.J. Sebastian took over as the Headmaster. Mr. D’Netto had put in 30 years of service.

In June 1977, Rev. Fr. Joy Panakel left St. Bede's to become the Provincial Economer and Rev. Fr. Clive D. Hurley was appointed Rector in his place. The school changed its academic year from January – December to June – May in the year 1978 and also adopted the higher secondary (Std. XI and XII) in July 1978, offering the students three groups: Maths, Physics, Chemistry and Biology in Group I; Economics, Commerce, Accountancy and Maths in Group II; and Logic, Economics, Commerce and Accountancy in Group III.

Rev. Bro. Xavier Singgraj died on 15 April 1978. He was one of the first group of Salesians who came to St. Bede's in 1956.

With the introduction of higher secondary courses, there was a need for additional classrooms and laboratories. To meet this requirement a 3-storied extension to the main block was launched in 1979. The structure, completed in 1980, now houses three  laboratories and several classrooms.

In 1979 a new Rector Major, the Very Rev. Fr. Egidio Vigano, was appointed. On 23 May 1980, Rev. Fr. Clive D. Hurley left St. Bede's for a new assignment at the Citadel and Rev. Fr. Stanislaus M. Fernandez took charge as Rector and Headmaster. The National Service Scheme (N.S.S.) was introduced for the Higher Secondary Section.

The Second Batch of Plus Two students who appeared for the Higher Secondary Board Exams in March 1981 achieved 100% passes with all 82 appeared passing of which 79 students obtained first class and the other three passing out with Second Class. All three boarders obtained first class. The passing record of the 1981 batch remains unmatched.

The centenary celebrations  
Alumni of St. Bede's Anglo Indian Higher Secondary School were invited to the celebrations of the school's centenary on 26 January 2008.

Several Old Bedeans flew in for the event, and close to 1,000 alumni had registered, members of the school administration said. Late Dr. APJ Abdul Kalam, the then President and the Missile man of India, had graced the mega event and inaugurated a stamp in commemoration of the Centenary celebrations of the school.

In 2008 the school added rural education to its outreach activities. It provides night schooling for children from the surrounding slums.

Notable alumni
 Surya Sivakumar (actor)
 Karthik Sivakumar (actor)
 Shahrukh Khan (cricketer)
 Vishnuvardhan (director)
 Karthik (actor)
 Radha Ravi (actor)
 Jeevan (actor)
 Karate R. Thiagarajan (President, Karate Association of India)
 Shankar (actor), Indian film actor
 Mahesh Babu (actor)
 K. E. Gnanavel Raja (film producer)
 Karthik Raja (music composer)
 Yuvan Shankar Raja (music composer)
 V. M. Muralidharan (Chairman, Ethiraj College for Women)
 Dinesh Karthik (cricketer)
 Venkat Prabhu (director)
 Premgi Amaren (playback singer, music composer, actor)
 Kreshna (actor)
 Vaibhav Reddy (actor)
 Krishnamachari Srikkanth (Indian ex-cricketer; studied in St. Bede's till 4th standard)
 Ravichandran Ashwin (cricketer)
 Abhinav Mukund (cricketer) 
 Baba Aparajith (cricketer)
 Yo Mahesh (cricketer)
 A. G. Kripal Singh (cricketer) 
 A.G. Milkha Singh (cricketer) 
 Washington Sundar(cricketer)

References

External links
 Official website

Salesian schools
Catholic secondary schools in India
Christian schools in Tamil Nadu
High schools and secondary schools in Chennai
Educational institutions established in 1907
1907 establishments in India